The Rudolph Latto House is a historic house in Hastings, Minnesota, United States, built 1880–1881.  It is listed on the National Register of Historic Places for local significance in architecture for its transitional Italianate/Eastlake design.  It was built in white Chaska brick.

History
Rudolph Latto was a German immigrant who arrived in Hastings in 1856 and rose from poverty to wealth as a  brewer, banker, hotelier, and grocer, affording him the means to build his grand home.  Upon its completion in 1881 it also served as a gathering place for Germans in the area. When Latto and his wife died without issue, they donated the building to the city for use as a hospital.  It served as such 1914–1949, then was used as a nursing home from 1949 to 1985.  With the building by then in need of major restoration, the Hastings government approved its sale to a private party.  The new owners completed a restoration and reopened the house in 1989 as a bed and breakfast inn.  The same owners had previously converted the nearby Thompson-Fasbender House into a bed and breakfast.  After an ownership change, the Latto House is now The Historic Inn on Ramsey Street.

See also
 National Register of Historic Places listings in Dakota County, Minnesota

References

External links
 The Historic Inn on Ramsey Street

Bed and breakfasts in Minnesota
Buildings and structures in Hastings, Minnesota
Defunct hospitals in Minnesota
German-American culture in Minnesota
Houses completed in 1881
Houses in Dakota County, Minnesota
Houses on the National Register of Historic Places in Minnesota
Italianate architecture in Minnesota
National Register of Historic Places in Dakota County, Minnesota
1881 establishments in Minnesota